Frøslev Camp was an internment camp in German-occupied Denmark during World War II.

In order to avoid deportation of Danes to German concentration camps, Danish authorities suggested, in January 1944, that an internment camp be created in Denmark. The German occupation authorities consented, and the camp was erected near the village of Frøslev in the south-west of Denmark, close to the German border. From mid-August until the end of the German occupation in May 1945, 12,000 prisoners passed through the camp's gates. Most of them were suspected members of the Danish resistance movement, Communists and other political prisoners. Living conditions in the camp were generally tolerable, but 1,600 internees were deported to German concentration camps, where 220 of them died (approximate numbers).

Towards the end of the war, the Swedish count Folke Bernadotte tried to get all Scandinavian concentration camp prisoners to Sweden. Simultaneously the Danish administration negotiated with the Germans about rescue of the Danish prisoners in Germany. As a result of these efforts many Scandinavian prisoners came with the White Buses from the German camps. In March and April 1945, 10,000 Danish and Norwegian captives were brought home from Germany. Some of the returning prisoners came to Frøslev Prison Camp. Among those were some of the 1,960 deported Danish policemen, which had been arrested and deported on 19 September 1944.

After the war
When the German occupation ended, the prisoners were released, only to be immediately replaced with suspected Nazi collaborators, and the camp's name was changed to Fårhus Camp (Fårhuslejren). The internment camp was now run by the Danish resistance movement, and among those interned was Frits Clausen, former leader of the Danish Nazi party. Later on, the Danish state took over from the resistance movement, using the camp as the country's largest correctional facility for convicted collaborators.

By 1949 most collaborators had served their sentences, and the camp was converted to army barracks under the name of Padborg Camp (Padborglejren). The Frøslev Prison Camp Museum (Frøslevlejrens Museum) was inaugurated in 1969. According to a 2001 agreement, the camp will be preserved as a national memorial park. Some parts of the original 1944–45 prison camp, which had been demolished, have now been reconstructed, including a watchtower and a portion of the barbed-wire fence. The area also houses a residential continuation high school named Frøslevlejrens Efterskole.

External links
  Website of the Frøslev Prison Camp Museum

Denmark in World War II
World War II internment camps in Denmark
World War II museums
Museums in the Region of Southern Denmark
Military and war museums in Denmark
National Museum of Denmark